Skyler Rose Samuels (born April 14, 1994) is an American actress and model, known for her roles in the television series Wizards of Waverly Place, The Gates, The Nine Lives of Chloe King, Scream Queens and The Gifted.

Early life
Samuels was born in Los Angeles, the daughter of Kathy, a producer for unscripted series, and Scott, a U.S. marshal. She has three brothers and a sister.

Career
Samuels held a recurring role as Gertrude "Gigi" Hollingsworth in Wizards of Waverly Place on Disney Channel. She also played the child celebrity Ashley Blake on the Drake and Josh episode "Little Diva". She then appeared in the films The Stepfather (2009) and Furry Vengeance (2010). She also starred in two series cancelled in their first season: the ABC series The Gates as Andie Bates and the ABC Family series The Nine Lives of Chloe King, in which she played Chloe.

Samuels next appeared in the recurring role of Bonnie Lipton in the fourth season of the FX horror series American Horror Story. She co-starred with Mae Whitman and Bella Thorne in the high school comedy film The DUFF (2015). She played a leading role in season one of the Fox horror comedy series Scream Queens. (2017). Samuels appears in a recurring role as all three Frost sisters (the Stepford Cuckoos) in the X-Men-based Fox television series The Gifted.

Personal life
Samuels studied marketing and intellectual property at Stanford University. Taking off a quarter to film Scream Queens, she returned to school in January 2016 and graduated in June 2016. She was a member of the Kappa Alpha Theta sorority.

Filmography

Film

Television

Awards

References

External links

 

1994 births
Living people
21st-century American actresses
Actresses from Los Angeles
American child actresses
American film actresses
American television actresses
Stanford University alumni